Pobres Rico is a 2012 Colombian telenovela produced and aired by RCN Televisión.

Cast

Los Rico
 Gonzalo Rico (Juan Pablo Raba)
 Gustavo Rico (Carlos Torres)
 Gabriela Rico (Maria Dalmazzo)
 Ester Blanco Viuda de Rico (Constanza Duque)

Los Siachoques
 Mariela Siachoque (Paola Rey)
 Carlos Siachoque (Diego Vásquez)
 Jhon Alexis Siachoque (Camilo Trujillo)
 Yusmary Siachoque (Vanesa Tamayo)
 Nicolás Rico Siachoque (Santiago Prieto)

Versions 
  Qué pobres tan ricos - a 2013 Mexican telenovela produced by Rosy Ocampo, starring Zuria Vega and Jaime Camil.
  Broke - a 2020 American loosely-based comedy series, Starring Jaime Camil, Pauley Perrette, Natasha Leggero, Izzy Diaz, and Antonio Raul Corbo.

References

External links 
  
 
 Pobres Rico at FilmAffinity

2012 telenovelas
Colombian telenovelas
RCN Televisión telenovelas
Spanish-language telenovelas
2012 Colombian television series debuts
2013 Colombian television series endings
Television shows set in Bogotá